Ganagavaram is a village and mandal located in Dr. B.R. Ambedkar Konaseema district of Andhra Pradesh, India.

References

Villages in Gangavaram mandal